The Alternative ( al-badeel) was an electoral alliance of several socialist Palestinian groups:
Democratic Front for the Liberation of Palestine (al-jabhah al-dīmūqrātiyyah li-tahrīr filastīn)
Palestinian People's Party (hizb al-sha`b al-filastīnī)
Palestine Democratic Union (al-ittihād al-dīmūqrātī al-filastīnī)
 Independents

In the January 2006 PLC elections it came fourth with 2.92% of the popular vote.  It had two deputies elected: Qais Abd al-Karim and Bassam as-Salhi.  Its best vote was in the Bethlehem Governorate, and its next best was in the Ramallah and al-Bireh Governorate.

The alliance was dissolved in early 2007.

References

Defunct political party alliances in the Palestinian territories
Democratic Front for the Liberation of Palestine
Socialist parties in the Palestinian territories